"Murrow Turning Over in His Grave" is the second track on Fleetwood Mac's 2003 album Say You Will. It was written and sung by Lindsey Buckingham. Similar to the first few tracks on Say You Will, its lyrics are politically charged, with Sal Cinquemani of Slant Magazine labeling "Murrow" as "an anti-media tirade". The song references Edward R. Murrow, a mid-20th century American newsman known for his honesty and integrity.

Structure
The song features Buckingham singing the two verses in a falsetto with the chorus being composed of many overdubbed vocals. Considerable studio production manipulation is used to give the song a synthetic and technological mood. The song's closing section features a distorted guitar solo of over 90 seconds while three separate guitars accompany.

The backing vocals of the chorus partially recreate the traditional song "Black Betty", with Buckingham singing "Ed Murrow had a child, the damn thing went wild" at a shared mix with the title being sang simultaneously.

During a live performance for a SoundStage DVD in 2004, the song was performed with only two guitars, while Lindsey Buckingham sang in his normal vocal range.

Meaning
Lindsey Buckingham has said that the song was written to reflect his belief that Edward R. Murrow, an iconic CBS journalist in the 1940s, 1950s and 1960s, would be greatly dismayed by the present-day media. Murrow was a great believer in honesty and integrity in delivering news to the people of the world: "to be persuasive, we must be believable; to be believable, we must be credible; to be credible, we must be truthful."

Personnel
Lindsey Buckingham – guitars, keyboards, vocals
Mick Fleetwood – drums, percussion
John McVie – bass guitar

References

2003 songs
Fleetwood Mac songs
Songs written by Lindsey Buckingham
Songs about the media